Edith Ingeborg Schippers (born 25 August 1964) is a retired Dutch politician of the People's Party for Freedom and Democracy (VVD) and businesswoman serving as President of DSM Netherlands since 1 February 2019.

Schippers, a political consultant by occupation, worked for the Industry and Employers Confederation from 1997 until 2003. Schippers became a Member of the House of Representatives shortly after the election of 2003 taking office on 3 June 2003, serving as a frontbencher and spokesperson for Health, deputy spokesperson for Employment and as deputy parliamentary leader. After the 2010 general election Schippers was appointed as Minister of Health, Welfare and Sport in the Cabinet Rutte I taking office on 14 October 2010. Following the election of 2012 she returned as a Member of the House of Representatives serving from 20 September 2012 until 5 November 2012, when she continued as Minister of Health, Welfare and Sport in the Cabinet Rutte II. In May 2017, Schippers announced her retirement from national politics and did not stand for the election of 2017, the Cabinet Rutte II was replaced by the Cabinet Rutte III on 26 October 2017.

Schippers retired after spending 14 years in national politics and became active in the private sector as a corporate director for DSM Netherlands.

Early life
Schippers was born in Utrecht, but spent her years attending primary school in Dordrecht. At the age of 12, she moved to Wachtum in Drenthe.

Edith Schippers' alma mater is Leiden University, where she studied political science from 1985 till 1991. She also spent half a year studying at Jawaharlal Nehru University in New Delhi, India in 1990.

In 1993, Schippers became personal assistant to member of parliament Dick Dees. She served in this position until 1994, after which she became a staff member of the VVD parliamentary fraction dealing with healthcare, welfare and sports. After that, Schippers found employment at employers' organisation VNO-NCW. From 1997 until 2001, her portfolio as secretary for VNO-CNW included healthcare and the labour market and from 2001 until 2003 spatial planning.

Political career

Schippers was elected into the House of Representatives in the 2003 general election and was sworn in on 3 June of that year. Geert Wilders became her mentor. In 2006, she was elected as vice chairman of the VVD parliamentary party. Schippers considered this a great honour, but not her greatest success.

In 2010, she succeeded Ab Klink in becoming Minister of Health, Welfare and Sport in the first Rutte cabinet. She briefly returned to the House of Representatives after the 2012 general election, but left again when the continuation of her ministership in the second Rutte cabinet was confirmed.

As Minister of Health, Schippers was repeatedly accused of being a tobacco industry lobbyist, and was labeled "minister Tobacco", because she had ties to the tobacco industry and because she tried to revert the ban on smoking in bars and cafes. She also overcame three motions of no confidence in the House of Representatives.

One was issued in 2012, for not adequately informing the States General about the costs of bringing the Olympics to the Netherlands. In the same year another motion of no confidence was issued against her and minister Henk Bleker, for the way they treated the issues surrounding Q-fever. In 2013 a motion was issued regarding her actions with regards to fraud in the healthcare sector. In 2016 this issue regarding her actions with regards to fraud in the healthcare sector was investigated on a Dutch talkshow 

In March 2017, she announced she would not return in a new cabinet. On 26 October 2017, she was succeeded by Hugo de Jonge.

Schippers briefly returned to the political scene following the 2017 general election, when Speaker Khadija Arib appointed Schippers as the so-called informateur, whose role is to explore possible governing alliances. In February 2018, she was speculated as a possible successor to the recently resigned Minister of Foreign Affairs Halbe Zijlstra, but she expressed that she was not available for another ministership, wanting instead to spend more time with her daughter.

Personal life
Schippers is married to Sander Spijker, a project manager for P5COM who is specialised in profit improvement and cost reduction in the healthcare industry. They have one child, a daughter.

References

External links

Official
  Drs. E.I. (Edith) Schippers Parlement & Politiek

 

 

1964 births
Living people
Dutch atheists
Dutch corporate directors
Dutch chief executives in the manufacturing industry
Dutch expatriates in India
Dutch former Christians
Dutch nonprofit directors
Dutch political consultants
21st-century Dutch businesswomen
21st-century Dutch businesspeople
Former Calvinist and Reformed Christians
Members of the House of Representatives (Netherlands)
Ministers of Health of the Netherlands
Ministers of Sport of the Netherlands
People from Baarn
Politicians from Utrecht (city)
People's Party for Freedom and Democracy politicians
Women government ministers of the Netherlands
20th-century Dutch women politicians
20th-century Dutch politicians
21st-century Dutch women politicians
21st-century Dutch politicians